is a Japanese monogatari which relates events in the life of courtier Fujiwara no Michinaga. It is believed to have been written by a number of authors, over the course of roughly a century, from 1028 to 1107.

It is notable for giving high credits to the Fujiwara family especially Michinaga. The work was translated into English by William H. and Helen Craig McCullough in 1980 as A Tale of Flowering Fortunes. It forms the basis for and is frequently referenced in Fumiko Enchi's retelling, A Tale of False Fortunes.

Summary 
The monogatari is related both to official court histories, such as the Rikkokushi, and other prose fiction, such as The Tale of Genji. It discusses the life and exploits of Michinaga and his family following his death. The first part, thirty volumes detailing the period from the reign of Emperor Uda until Michinaga's death, is believed to have been written between 1028 and 1034 by Akazome Emon and/or Fujiwara no Tamenari. The second portion is ten volumes covering part of the reign of Emperor Horikawa and is referred to collectively as the zokuhen. It is generally attributed to Idewa no Ben who would have written between 1092 and 1107. The forty scrolls which comprise the text are written entirely in kana, and include many excerpts from diaries and notes of court ladies. Twenty-eight of these scrolls are devoted to Michinaga's governance, while the remaining twelve concern related topics, including other aspects of his life and the lives of his family.

Textual history 
Depending on the form of the book, the textual lineage of the work is divided into three distinct lines: the ancient book lineage, the popular book lineage, and variant lineage.

The main texts used include the Umezawa-bon and Yōmeibunko-bon (ancient book lineage); Nishihonganji-bon, Kokatsuji-bon, Meirekikan-bon, and Eirikyūkanshōshutsu-bon (popular book lineage); and Tomioka-bon (variant lineage).

Among these, the Umezawa-bon, the oldest extant complete manuscript which was transcribed by the mid-Kamakura period, was acquired by Sanjōnishi Sanetaka and passed down to his progeny. It was designated a national treasure in 1935 under the contemporaneous Law for the Preservation of National Treasures, and again in 1955 under the Law for the Protection of Cultural Properties. The text is a combination of the Ōgata-bon (a mid-Kamakura period manuscript of the tale up to book 20) and the Masugata-bon (an early-Kamakura period manuscript of the tale up to book 40). The specifics of Sanetaka's acquisition of the text are detailed in the passages for the fourth and eighth days of the eleventh month of the sixth year of Eishō (1509). The Umezawa-bon is used as the base text for the publications from Iwanami bunko, Nihon koten bungaku taikei, Shinpen nihon koten bungaku zenshū.

List of chapter titles 
The English translations here are taken from Helen and William McCullough's translation of the first 30 chapters and from Takeshi Watanabe's online translations of the zokuhen chapters. Japanese readings are taken from the Nihon koten bungaku zenshū.

See also 
 Japanese Historical Text Initiative

References

Further reading
 
Sansom, George (1958). 'A History of Japan to 1334'. Stanford, California: Stanford University Press.

External links
Manuscript scans at Waseda University Library: 10-volumes (unknown date), 9 volumes (unknown date)

Japanese chronicles
Late Old Japanese texts
Monogatari
11th-century history books
History books of the Heian Period